Dahab Faytinga (born 10 June 1964), known professionally as Faytinga, is an Eritrean singer and musician. She belongs to the Nilotic Kunama and Tigrinya ethnic groups.

Early life
Faytinga was born on 10 June 1964 in Asmara, Ethiopian Empire, now called Eritrea from her Tigrinya mother and Kunama father,who was a revered freedom fighter among the ethnic group. The state of anarchy that ensued in 1942 after the defeat of the Italian army, forced her father to form a military band to defend the Kunama people against the raids they suffered. He was given the nickname of 'Fighting gun' (taken from his name 'Faid Tinga') by the British administration in the early 1950s. Between 1952 and 1962, he was elected enthusiastically to represent the Kunama people. At the end of the Federal arrangement he was imprisoned several times by the Ethiopian Government for his pro-Eritrean work. He was a political prisoner when the Ethiopian military regime came to power and he was freed by the EPLF in 1974 when they stormed the prison in Asmara. Faid Tinga Longhi was a hero for the Kunama people.

in 1977, at the age of fourteen, Faytinga joined the liberation struggle and she became a combatant during the Eritrean War of Independence until the liberation in 1991. After being given military and political training at Bilekat, she was assigned to the public administration department. In 1987 she started to work with the Department of National Guidance to set up the Kunama radio programme. She then joined the cultural troupe as a Kunama language singer. In the late 1980s, Faytinga was reassigned to the public administration
department in Kassala, Sudan and later Tokombia, where she was elected as member of the assembly of the National Union of Eritrean Women’s of Tokombia district.

Career and musical style

In 1990, Faytinga toured the US and Europe as a member of The National Folkloric Troupe of Eritrea called the Sibrit Cultural Troupe. After releasing her first album “Sala Da Goda” on tape, she toured for the first time as a solo artist in 1995. Faytinga won the 2nd prize and 1st East African women singer at the 2000 Ma’ Africa in Benoni, South Africa. It took until 1999 and an appearance at the Africolor festival in France, before she could record her first album "Numey".

Faytinga composes her own songs and also interprets work from well-known poets and composers from Eritrea. When singing, she plays the krar, a small lyre.

The CD album "Numey" is Faytinga's first international release on the Paris-based Cobalt label. All of the songs on this album of hers are in her native Kunama language, which belongs to the Nilo-Saharan family.

In 2003, Faytinga released her second album "Eritrea". Besides the krar and wata, she also brought guitar, flute, and percussion sounds.

Faytinga has always been interested in music and developed her style ‘in the field’ that represents her own blend of several traditional music forms.

World stage

Faytinga has been performing around the world representing Eritrea as a 'cultural ambassador' for her country. As Marco Cavallarin wrote in the Italian journal Africa e Mediterraneo, 'Faytinga interprets the profound culture of her country and its most ancient and more recent history, from the origins of the Kunama people to the war of liberation from the invading Ethiopia'. She participated in particular to Expo 2005 in Aichi, Japan and to Expo 2010 in Shanghai, China. She also attended the Earth Summit 2002 held in Johannesburg, South Africa. In addition, she has been collaborated with other artists such as the group Ouï-Dire in an attempt to mix her voice, her music and culture with that of other continents.

Faytinga's music or photos are featured in various books, expositions, blogs, video documentaries, and other.

On 30 August 2004, in an interview with Joel Savage for The Voice Magazine she said that “I sing about peace, love, and togetherness, since war, conflict and other disturbances did not bring any positive change to Africa, but it only creates refugee crisis, pains, agony, discomfort and economic hardship. I bring a music of hope to the people.” With this spirit Faytinga played at the FLOG International music Festival in Florence (2004).

Discography

Albums
 Numey - Cobalt Records, 2 January 2000. Songs from this album 
Numey; Milobe; Amajo; Lagàla Fàla Fesso; Kundura; Aleyda; Alemuye; Milomala; Asàmen Gàna; Salada Goda

 Eritrea - Cobalt Records, 1 November 2003. Songs from this album:
Goda Anna; Hakuma Tia; Degsi; Leledia; Eritrea; Amajo; Laganga; Alemuye; Taham Bele; Sema 'Ett; Buba

Singles
 Megesha - Music Video, YouTube Faytinga channel, published 15-Dec-2012
 Ciao, Ciao - Music Video, YouTube Faytinga channel, published 17-Dec-2012
 Sebaki fkri - Digital distribution, independent, June 2014
 Wedi Asmara (Son Of Asmara) - Digital distribution, independent, December 2014
 Ala Ska - Music Video, YouTube Faytinga channel, published 20-Dec-2015
 Besela - Digital distribution, independent, July 2016 and Music Video, YouTube Faytinga channel, published 30-Dec-2016
 Kebkeba Kone - Music Video, YouTube Faytinga and FaytingaVEVO channels, published 16-Aug-2017
 Deglele - Digital distribution, independent, January 2018, and Music Video, YouTube Faytinga and FaytingaVEVO channels, published 11-Jan-2018
 Lebam U Zdle - Digital distribution, independent, February 2019 and Music Video, YouTube Faytinga and FaytingaVEVO channels, published 23-Nov-2018
 Goda Anna (Remix) - Digital distribution, Independent, June 2019
 Tsela'ika - Digital distribution, independent, June 2021 and Music Video, YouTube and FaytingaVEVO channels, June 2021
 Faytinga & Temesghen Yared Resolution Song (Eritrea) - Resolution Song LP, April 2022
 Fishaley - Digital distribution, independent, June 2022 and Music Video, YouTube Faytinga channel, June 2022

Features
 World Divas (Wagram Records, 2006) - Song "Lagàla Fàla Fesso"
 Africolor, Musiques du Monde (Believe, Cobalt, 2008) - Song "Hakuma Tia"
 The Asmara All Stars : Eritrea's Got Soul (Out Here, 2010) - Songs "Amajo" and "Gwaila International"
 Miombo by Laroz (Sol Selectas, April 2021) - Songs "Laganga feat. Faytinga (Original Mix)" and "Laganga feat. Faytinga (Rodrigo Gallardo Remix)"
 Summer Sol VII by various artists (Sol Selectas, July 2022) - Song "Naomi" by Laroz featuring Song "Numey" by Faytinga
 Asmara by Hermon Mehari (Komos Jazz, November 2022) - Songs "Tanafaqit" and "Milobe - Lawa Furda" by Faytinga and Hermon Mehari

Advocacy
Faytinga is one of the first artists from Eritrea engaged in support of people living with HIV and AIDS. She has participated in numerous World AIDS Day events including as guest-star singer on 1 December 2003 during the event held at the Hotel Intercontinental, and in June 2005, together with Kenyan singer Achieng Abura in an exceptional gala diner concert for the benefit of women and children affected by HIV and AIDS. She also performed on the occasion of the opening of the Namibia gender-based violence Art Exhibition on 10 December 2013 at UNAIDS Headquarters in Geneva. In 2022, together with Eritrean musician and singer Temesghen Yared, she developed an Eritrean version of the “World on Our Shoulders” song, also called the “Resolution Song”. The Resolution Song brings together voices from all over the world in a demonstration of global unity and a call for action to protect the planet. The Eritrean version of this song is featured with 16 other versions in the "Resolution Song" album released on Earth Day, 22 April 2022.

See also
Music of Eritrea

References

External links
 Official Faytinga Site

1964 births
Living people
20th-century Eritrean women singers
Ethiopian rebels
Krar players
21st-century Eritrean women singers